Project Hostile Intent is an ongoing project of the United States Department of Homeland Security, Human Factors Division. It has been renamed to Future Attribute Screening Technology. This project comes under the Social and Behavioral Research (SBR) Program, one of the three broad program areas within the Science and Technology (S&T) Directorate of the Department of Homeland Security (DHS) that "sponsors research to inform, develop, and test tools and methodologies to assess terrorist threats, understand terrorism, and improve national security".

Project Hostile Intent aims to detect and model the behavioral cues that indicate an individual's intent to do harm and/or deceive. The cues examined in Project Hostile Intent are those that can be assessed remotely and in real time, like pulse rate, sweating, restless behavior, and possibly brain scans. The procedures and technologies required to collect these cues are non-invasive (like surveillance cameras and body heat sensors) and amenable to integration into busy operational contexts, like airports.

In addition to detecting these cues, this project examines whether this process can be automated through the use of sensors and detection algorithms and, subsequently, integrated with other technologies aimed at identifying individuals who pose threats to the US, e.g., biometric tools and databases. The expected users of this project are U.S. Customs and Border Protection and Transportation Security Administration personnel.

See also
Visible Intermodal Prevention and Response team
Future Attribute Screening Technology

References

External links
 Testimony of the American Psychological Association, Submitted for the record House Appropriations Subcommittee on Homeland Security Regarding Funding for Fiscal Year 2007
 Project description in S&T Snapshots, from the DHS Science and Technology
 The Guardian news report- Security firms working on devices to spot would-be terrorists in crowd

United States Department of Homeland Security
Forensic psychology